V.P. Sajeendran was a member of the Kerala Legislative Assembly from Kunnathunadu constituency, Ernakulam, Kerala, India representing Indian National Congress. He was born to Padmanabhan and Janakey on 31 May 1969 at Anicad. He obtained his graduation in Law. He is an executive member of Kerala Pradesh Congress Committee (KPCC) and a member of All India Congress Committee (AICC). In 2021 election he lost to LDF candidate Adv. Sreenijin ex Congress leader with margin of 2334 votes.

References

External links

1969 births
Living people
Indian National Congress politicians from Kerala
Malayali politicians
People from Kottayam district
Kerala MLAs 2011–2016